Michael Kundi (born 1950) is the head of the Institute of Environmental Health of the Medical University of Vienna, Austria. He has published over 200 articles in various scientific journals.

Kundi attended the University of Vienna where he studied Psychology, Medicine, and Mathematics and received a PhD in 1979. In 1989, he received his habilitation in Epidemiology and Occupational Health from the Medical University of Vienna.

References

1950 births
Living people
Environmental health practitioners
University of Vienna alumni